Miss Brazil 2013, the 59th edition of the Miss Brazil pageant, was held in Belo Horizonte on September 28, 2013. The winner was Jakelyne Oliveira, who represented Brazil in the 2013 Miss Universe pageant. Twenty-six delegates from each state and the Federal District competed for the crown. The previous titleholder, Gabriela Markus of Rio Grande do Sul, crowned her successor at the end of the event.

Results

Placements

Special Awards
 The winner of the prize Miss Internet would go to semis.

Order of Announcements

Top 15

 Sergipe
 Rio Grande do Sul
 Bahia
 Espírito Santo
 Santa Catarina
 Pará
 Pernambuco
 Rio Grande do Norte
 São Paulo
 Paraná
 Mato Grosso
 Rio de Janeiro
 Ceará
 Minas Gerais
 Mato Grosso do Sul

Top 10

 Bahia
 Ceará
 Mato Grosso
 Minas Gerais
 Paraná
 Pernambuco
 Rio Grande do Norte
 Rio Grande do Sul
 São Paulo
 Sergipe

Top 5

 Paraná
 Mato Grosso
 Bahia
 São Paulo
 Minas Gerais

Top 3

 Bahia
 Mato Grosso
 Minas Gerais

Contestants 

  - Raíssa Campêlo
  - Nicole Verçosa
  - Nathaly Uchôa
  - Tereza Santana
  - Priscila Santiago
  - Mariana Vasconcelos
  - Nahtalia Costa
  - Desiane "Anne" Volponi
  - Sileimã Pinheiro
  - Ingrid Gonçalves
  - Jakelyne Oliveira
  - Patrícia Machry
  - Janaína Barcelos
  - Anne Carolline Vieira
  - Patrícia dos Anjos
  - Isis Stocco
  - Helena Rios
  - Nathalya Araújo
  - Orama Valentim
  - Cristina Alves
  - Vitória Sulczinski
  - Jeane Aguiar
  - Bianca Matte
  - Francielle Kloster
  - Bruna Michels
  - Lisianny Bispo
  - Wiolana Barbosa

External links
Official Miss Brasil website

2013
2013 in Brazil
2013 beauty pageants